Daedeoksan  is a mountain in the cities of Taebaek and Samcheok, Gangwon-do in South Korea.

See also
List of mountains in Korea

Notes

References

Mountains of Gangwon Province, South Korea
Samcheok
Taebaek
Mountains of South Korea
One-thousanders of South Korea
Taebaek Mountains

zh:大德山 (江原道)